Mijailo "Mikan" Grušanović (born 19 September 1962) is a Serbian former professional basketball player.

Playing career 
A center, Grušanović played professional basketball for over 30 years for Serbia-based clubs Iva Šabac, Beopetrol, Borac Čačak, NIS Vojvodina, Lavovi 063, Swisslion Takovo, and  OKK Šabac.

References

1962 births
Living people
Centers (basketball)
KK Beopetrol/Atlas Beograd players
KK Borac Čačak players
KK Iva Zorka Šabac players
KK Lavovi 063 players
KK Lions/Swisslion Vršac players
KK Vojvodina Srbijagas players
OKK Šabac players
People from Bogatić
Serbian expatriate basketball people in Bosnia and Herzegovina
Serbian men's basketball players
Yugoslav men's basketball players